The Yakweakwioose First Nation or Yakweakwioose Band is a band government of the Sto:lo people located in the Upper Fraser Valley region at Sardis, near Chilliwack, British Columbia, Canada.  They are a member government of the Sto:lo Nation tribal council.

The traditional languages of the people are Halq'eméylem, hən̓q̓əmin̓əm̓, and Hul’q’umi’num.’ Yeqwyeqwí:ws is the proper Halq’eméylem spelling of Yakweakwioose. As of June 2021, the Nation had a total of 78 registered members, including 39 residing on their own reserve.

References

Sto:lo governments
First Nations governments in the Lower Mainland